Ganger or Gangar (Village ID 59169) is a small village in the Karnal district of Haryana state of India. It is under Indri constituency of Haryana state assembly. Most people are dependent on agriculture for their livelihood.Famous personalities from Ganger village " Manoj Rana s/o  Ranbir singh", "R.L Chauhan".The main crops are rice, tomato, onion and wheat. The village also hosts a Century Plyboards (I) Ltd ctory.

According to the 2011 census it has a population of 1085 living in 199 households.

References

Villages in Karnal district